Hasselborg may refer to:

People
Anna Hasselborg (born 1989), Swedish female curler, 2018 Winter Olympics champion in women's curling
Marcus Hasselborg (born 1986), Swedish male curler
Maria Hasselborg (Mio) (born 1980), Swedish female curler
Mikael Hasselborg (born 1954), Swedish male curler and coach
Stefan Hasselborg (born 1949), Swedish male curler and coach

Places
Hasselborg Cabin (Hasselborg Creek Cabin), backcountry shelter in the Admiralty Island National Monument, part of Tongass National Forest in Southeast Alaska
Hasselborg Lake North Shelter Cabin
Hasselborg Lake East Shelter Cabin
Hasselborg Lake South Shelter Cabin

Other uses